Phyllobrostis fregenella is a moth in the Lyonetiidae family. It is found in Morocco, Tunisia, Portugal, Spain, France, Corsica, mainland Italy and Sicily.

The wingspan is 6.2–7.5 mm for males and 8–9.5 mm for females.

The larvae feed on Daphne gnidium. They mine the leaves of their host plant. The mine starts as a narrow corridor along the midrib, not far from the leaf tip. Later, a large full-depth blotch is made that can occupy the entire leaf. The brown frass is glued to the upper epidermis, only leaving the sides transparent. Pupation takes place outside of the mine.

External links
Revision of the genus Phyllobrostis Staudinger, 1859 (Lepidoptera, Lyonetiidae)
bladmineerders.nl

Lyonetiidae
Moths of Europe
Moths described in 1940